Darralynn Hutson is an American Pop Culture Journalist, TV and Film producer and multi-media Specialist.

Darralynn Hutson has been an entertainment journalist for more than twelve years. She learned the skill of listening very early in her career and its allowed her to develop longstanding relationships in the entertainment industry. She started her writing career with Urban magazines Upscale and The Source Magazine, reviewing and interviewing what would become Hip Hop greatest. Her niche pieces on black film has appeared in The Source Magazine, Honey, DGA Magazine, Savoy Magazine, Trace and Moviemaker. She writes as a Scores and Soundtracks columnist for London-based BFM Magazine and the re-launched BE formerly Black Elegance. Her experience as a journalist has afforded her to motion picture industry access. Her Rolodex is valued and current.

Hutson exploded into the film industry after independently producing a film tribute to Langston Hughes, entitled Hughes’ Dream Harlem, with Harlem-based New Heritage Films in 2002. The film made its national broadcast debut on the Starz! Network and went on to tour five continents in film festivals, Corporate-funded screenings and college tours. Her very first video production was Connections: a short documentary on the award-winning directors of the American Black Film Festival, formerly the Acapulco Black Film Festival, which screening during their fifth anniversary celebration in 2001.

Most recently she’s been a part of production management of two series for MTV Networks NEVER BEFORE SCENE: I, ROBOT and YOUR MOVIE SHOW: Shark Tale. Relocating to New York in 2002, allowed her independent film experience to flourish. Darralynn has worked on the production teams of five short and feature-length film and video independent productions. TV One hired her to produce a pilot episode of a new home renovation series RENOVATE MY HOME that premiered its first season in November 2005. It was also in 2005 when her partnership with Justin Bryant produced the licensing of eight episodes of the original program for BET JAZZ, The Musicmakers currently negotiating its second season.

References
http://www.thirteen.org/pressroom/release.php?get=1993
http://www2.prnewswire.com/cgi-bin/stories.pl?ACCT=104&STORY=/www/story/04-16-2002/0001707499&EDATE=
http://www.gerardbutler.net/news/news_main.php?Action=Full&NewsID=4544
http://www.urbanslam.com/movie_tested.html
http://allhiphop.com/stories/lifestylefilm/archive/2008/06/05/20039584.aspx
http://www.netweed.com/hiphoppress/2005_11_06_archive.html
http://allhiphop.com/stories/lifestylefashion/archive/2010/03/03/22136409.aspx

Living people
American women journalists
Journalists from New York City
Year of birth missing (living people)
21st-century American women